Fritz Schupp (22 December 1896 in Uerdingen – 1 August 1974 in Essen) was a German architect.
He was educated from 1914 to 1917 at the Universities of Karlsruhe, München and Stuttgart. Despite mostly working alone, he formed a partnership based in Essen and Berlin with Martin Kremmer . From 1949,  Schupp was a lecturer at the  Technical University in Hannover.
Between 1920 and 1974, he built 69 factories and plants. In the Bergbauarchiv (Bochum), 17500 sketches are at the disposal of researchers.
His best-known work was the Zollverein Coal Mine Industrial Complex, a UNESCO World Heritage Site since 2001.

Works 
 1921: Zeche Holland 3/4/6 in Wattenscheid
 1922: Mine's head offices Am Knie in Dortmund-Neuasseln
 1927: Cock factory in Gelsenkirchen
 1928–1930: Evangelist church in Berlin-Niederschöneweide
 1928–1932: Plant Zeche Zollverein 12 in Essen
 vor 1930: Hall of „Zeche in Horst bei Essen“
 1936: Over surface installations Rammelsberg in Goslar
 1936: Monument for the victims of the Schlagwetter-Explosion in Flöz „Ida“ Zeche Adolf von Hansemann in  Dortmund-Mengede
 1938: Extension of the farm Schulte up der Hege in Werksfürsorge Zollverein
 1936–1940: German Mining Museum in Bochum (with Heinrich Holzapfel)
 1940–1951: Powerplant Gustav Knepper in Dortmund-Mengede
 1944: Pit Zeche Germania in Dortmund-Marten (transformed in 1974 as a heritage of the Deutschen Bergbaumuseum in Bochum)
 1948–1952: Pit Grimberg 1/2 in Bergkamen
 1950: Tower Zeche Friedlicher Nachbar in Bochum-Linden
 1953: Social offices of the Rammelsberg mine in Goslar
 1953: Pit Zeche Pluto Wilhelm in Herne-Wanne
 1954: Pit 7 of Zeche Ewald in Herten
 1954: Aden house in Lünen
 1955–1956: Tower over pit 2 der Zeche Lohberg in Dinslaken
 1955–1959: Pit Katharina in Essen-Kray
 1950er Jahre: Tower, hall and washing facilities of pit Hugo in Gelsenkirchen-Buer
 1958–1960: Powerplant Springorum in Bochum-Weitmar
 1960: Tower of the Zeche Vereinigte Dahlhauser Tiefbau pit in Bochum-Dahlhausen
 1964: Concrete tower of pits 4 and 6 in Zeche Sophia-Jacoba in Ratheim

References

More 
 Wilhelm Busch: F. Schupp, M. Kremmer. Bergbauarchitektur 1919–1974. Rheinland-Verlag, Köln 1980, .
 Wilhelm Busch, Thorsten Scheer (Hrsg.): Symmetrie und Symbol. Die Industriearchitektur von Fritz Schupp und Martin Kremmer. Köln 2002, .

External links 
 
 Bauten von Fritz Schupp in Bochum

1974 deaths
1896 births
20th-century German architects
People from Krefeld